Partabpura is a village in  Jalandhar District of Punjab.

Overview
Partabpura is on the Phillaur-Nurmahal road, close to  Bilga village. Partabpura is well linked by road with Nurmahal, Phillaur, Bilga and other neighboring villages and towns. It has historical gurudwaras, mandirs and mosques. Village is divided in 4 portions (portion of a village is known as a patti) which have their own specific names.

Partabpura Railway Station serves this area. Phillaur is nearest railway junction. The nearest airport is at Ludhiana.

Partabura consists of 2500 homes and is the biggest village in the immediate area.

Geography 
Partabpura is located at .It has an average elevation of 243 metres (797 feet).

Schools and college

Govt. Primary School
Guru Nanak Public School
SBS Evershine Convent School
Govt. Sen. Sec. School
I.T.I. College

PIN Code & STD Code
Partabpura's PIN code and STD code are 144035 & 01826 respectively.

References

External links

Villages in Jalandhar district
Villages in Phillaur tehsil